Pierre Laffitte (1 January 1925 – 7 July 2021) was a French politician and scientist. He was the founder of Sophia Antipolis and represented Alpes-Maritimes in the Senate of France from 1985 to 2008 as a member of the Radical Party (PR).

Biography
Pierre was the son of Jean Laffitte, a painter born in Algiers, and Lucie Fink, born in Strasbourg under the German Empire. In 2007, Fink was recognized as Righteous Among the Nations. In 1949, Pierre married Sofia Grigorievna Glikman-Toumarkine, who died in 1979. He then married Anita Garcia in 1985, who died in 2005, and lastly married Isabelle Michel.

Laffitte graduated from the École Polytechnique and began his career with the Ministry of Industry. He left the Ministry in 1963 and became deputy director of teaching at the Corps des Mines of Mines ParisTech.

Laffitte joined the Radical Party early in his life and entered politics in 1961 as a Municipal Councilor in his hometown of Saint-Paul-de-Vence. He became the deputy for Senator  in 1971. When Palmero died in May 1985, Laffitte filled his seat. He was re-elected in 1989 and 1998. From 2007 to 2008, he was President of the European Democratic and Social Rally group. In 2008, the election in Alpes-Maritimes was changed to an election by list, and Laffitte ran within the Miscellaneous right, allocation 9.2% of votes, finishing fourth and failing to maintain his Senate seat.

Pierre Laffitte died on 7 July 2021 at the age of 96.

Distinctions
Officer of the Legion of Honour
Officer of the Ordre national du Mérite
Commander of the Order of the Polar Star
Commander of the Order of Merit of the Federal Republic of Germany
Member of the KTH Royal Institute of Technology
President of the Haut Conseil culturel franco-allemand (1988–2001)
Adenauer-de Gaulle Prize (1994)
Prix du promoteur de la société de l'information (2004)
Doctor honoris causa of the Colorado School of Mines
Doctor honoris causa of the Open University

Works
Introduction à l'étude des roches métamorphiques et des gîtes métallifères
Métallogénie de la France
Carte minière du globe sur fond tectonique au 1/20 0000e
Traité d'informatique géologique
Les Technopoles en France
Sophia Antipolis. Naissance d'une Ville ?
L'Accès au savoir par la télévision

References

1925 births
2021 deaths
Senators of Alpes-Maritimes
French mining engineers
French Righteous Among the Nations
Radical Party (France) politicians
French Senators of the Fifth Republic
École Polytechnique alumni
People from Alpes-Maritimes
KTH Royal Institute of Technology
Officiers of the Légion d'honneur
Officers of the Ordre national du Mérite
Commanders of the Order of the Polar Star
Commanders Crosses of the Order of Merit of the Federal Republic of Germany
Academic staff of Mines Paris - PSL